Whitney North Seymour Jr. (July 7, 1923 – June 29, 2019), known to friends as Mike Seymour, was an American politician and attorney from New York City. Born to a prominent family, Seymour graduated from  Princeton University and Yale Law School and served in the United States Army during World War II. He served in the New York State Senate from 1966 to 1968 and as U.S. Attorney for the Southern District of New York from 1970 to 1973.

As U.S. Attorney, Seymour prosecuted a number of high-profile organized crime and corruption cases. A moderate Republican, Seymour unsuccessfully sought a seat in the U.S. House of Representatives in 1968, and unsuccessfully sought the Republican nomination for U.S. Senate in 1982. Seymour was an attorney for many years with the law firm of Simpson Thacher & Bartlett, but left in the early 1980s to form a smaller law firm. In 1986, he was appointed as independent counsel to investigate former Reagan White House official Michael Deaver, and successfully secured a perjury conviction the next year.

Seymour co-founded the Natural Resources Defense Council, an environmentalist group, in 1970. As a civic leader in New York, he served on a number of boards, and played an important role in the Municipal Art Society's push for passage of the city's 1965 Landmarks Law. Seymour wrote three books and, in later life, co-wrote a one-act play that was performed off-Broadway. He died in 2019 at age 95.

Early life and military service
Seymour was born in Huntington, West Virginia, on July 7, 1923, the son of Whitney North Seymour (1901–1983) and Lola Vickers Seymour (d. 1975). He grew up in the Manhattan borough of New York City, in a rowhouse in the Greenwich Village. Seymour's father was a prominent attorney who served as assistant solicitor general during the Herbert Hoover administration. Seymour's brother was academician Thaddeus Seymour.

Seymour graduated from the Kent School in Connecticut.  He joined the U.S. Army in 1943, serving as an artillery officer in the Pacific theater during World War II, and resigning in 1945 with the rank of captain.

After the war, Seymour attended college at Princeton University, graduating magna cum laude in 1947. He then attended Yale Law School, earning a Juris Doctor degree in 1950.

Career

Early career in law and politics
Seymour joined the law firm of Simpson Thacher & Bartlett in 1950; his father had been a longtime partner at the firm. He was an assistant U.S. attorney in Manhattan from 1953 to 1956. Seymour then returned to private practice before being appointed, three years later, as counsel to the State Commission on New York City Governmental Operations.

Seymour was a member of the New York State Senate from 1966 to 1968, sitting in the 176th and 177th New York State Legislatures. He was the Republican nominee for the United States House of Representatives in the New York's 17th congressional district in November 1968, running against Democrat Ed Koch in the "silk stocking" district.

In the Republican primary election, Seymour eked out a win against S. William Green, receiving 12,291 votes to Green's 10,851. To maintain his nearly perfect record of attendance in the state Senate, Seymour also missed many opportunities to make campaign appearances during the primary campaign. In the general election, Koch and Seymour differed more on matters of style than on issues of policy; Koch was an adept and indefatigable campaigner with a constant public presence, while the patrician Seymour disliked street politics. Koch spoke about his record of engaging in protests and pickets (on causes such as support for the Delano grape strike and opposition to the Vietnam War) while Seymour that he had "never joined any kind of protest march or demonstration" except for a march to ban automobiles from Central Park. Although he received the endorsement of Mayor John V. Lindsay, Seymour lost the race; Koch won with 48% of the vote (on both the Democratic and Liberal Party ballot lines), while Seymour received 45% of the vote and Conservative Party candidate Richard J. Callahan received 5.8% of the vote. Seymour thus became the first Republican in three decades to lose the congressional election in the "silk stocking" district.

Involvement in founding of the NRDC
In 1970, Seymour was among the group that co-founded the Natural Resources Defense Council (NRDC), and served on its board. The NRDC's establishment was partially an outgrowth of the Scenic Hudson Preservation Conference v. Federal Power Commission, the Storm King case, in which Seymour was involved. The case centered on Con Ed's plan to build the world's largest hydroelectric facility at Storm King Mountain. The proposed facility would pump vast amounts of water from the Hudson River to a reservoir, and release it through turbines to generate electricity at peak demand. A dozen concerned citizens organized the Scenic Hudson Preservation Conference in opposition to the project, citing its environmental impact, and the group, represented by Seymour, his law partner Stephen Duggan, and David Sive, sued the Federal Power Commission, and successfully achieved a ruling that groups such as Scenic Hudson and other environmentalist groups had standing to challenge the FPC's administrative rulings. Realizing that continued environmental litigation would require a nationally organized, professionalized group of lawyers and scientists, Duggan, Seymour, and Sive obtained funding from the Ford Foundation and joined forces with Gus Speth and other recent Yale Law School graduates of the class of 1969 to form the NRDC, with John H. Adams as the group's first staff member, Duggan as its first chairman, and Seymour, Laurance Rockefeller, and others as board members.

U.S. Attorney for the Southern District of New York
He was U.S. Attorney for the Southern District of New York from 1970 to 1973, replacing Robert Morgenthau. As U.S. Attorney, Seymour and his criminal division chief, Harold Baer Jr., took action to reduce a large backlog of criminal cases in the Southern District. As U.S. Attorney, Seymour also prosecuted New York City Police Department corruption and misconduct cases brought by the Knapp Commission. Under Seymour, former Richard Nixon Cabinet members John N. Mitchell and Maurice H. Stans were indicted on charges of accepting illegal campaign contributions from fugitive Robert Vesco, but both were acquitted. He also oversaw the prosecutions of a number of organized crime figures, including Frank Costello, and corrupt public officials, including former State Senator Seymour R. Thaler. Seymour was, however, initially skeptical about the practical use of the then-new Racketeer Influenced and Corrupt Organizations (RICO) Act; in a meeting with G. Robert Blakey, the law professor who pioneered the act, Seymour dismissed RICO as a waste of time. Later, after RICO's value in fighting organized crime was demonstrated, Seymour acknowledged that "in hindsight we were one hundred percent wrong."

As U.S. Attorney, Seymour represented the United States government in seeking an injunction to stop The New York Times from publishing the Pentagon Papers; the United States Supreme Court ultimately ruled in favor of the Times in the case New York Times Co. v. United States. Seymour's longtime friend Powell Pierpoint said that Seymour "represented the government like a good soldier, though I don't think he personally believed in the case. ... He made a damn good argument out of a poor case. He presented the argument himself. That's the kind of fellow Mike is." Later, however, Seymour was critical of the Times handling of the case; in a 1994 article in the New York State Bar Journal, he wrote that he remained "appalled at the arrogance and irresponsibility displayed by the news media in setting up a totally unnecessary confrontation over publication of stolen classified documents relating to U.S. policies in Vietnam." In Seymour's view, from a practical perspective, the government had "lost the battle but won the war" in the Pentagon Papers cases, since the Times and Washington Post, following the Supreme Court's decision, did not publish material whose release could damage national security, such as the "secret Defense Department study directly affecting military and intelligence operations and secret diplomatic efforts to achieve peace."

Return to private practice and 1982 Senate election
After stepping down in the U.S. Attorney post in 1973, Seymour returned to private practice at Simpson Thacher & Bartlett.

Seymour unsuccessfully sought the Republican nomination for U.S. Senator from New York in the 1982 election. He ran as a self-described moderate Republican, in the mold of Dwight Eisenhower or Jacob Javits. Seymour was backed by many former aides to Mayor Lindsay, and had the most establishment support. He won the support of the Republican Party's New York State Committee, but former State Banking Superintendent Muriel Siebert and State Assemblywoman Florence M. Sullivan garnered enough support to make it onto the primary ballot. Sullivan, the most conservative of the primary candidates, won the primary with a comfortable lead. Seymour came in last place, and later said that he had taken "a foolish stab" at the nomination.

In 1982, Seymour departed from Simpson Thacher & Bartlett after more than three decades of affiliation with the firm, believing that large law firms were becoming too bureaucratic. He joined with another lawyer, Peter Megargee Brown (formerly of Cadwalader, Wickersham & Taft), to form a small two-person firm.

Independent counsel in Deaver case
In May 1986, a panel of three federal judges appointed Seymour as independent counsel to investigate Michael Deaver, a senior aide to President Ronald Reagan. Deaver was the deputy chief of staff in the Reagan White House before leaving in May 1985 and becoming a lobbyist for the Canadian government. Deaver was indicted on five counts of perjury on charges that he had given false testimony to a grand jury that he did not remember a January 1985 meeting with Canadian ambassador Allan Gotlieb and his wife Sondra. Deaver challenged the constitutionality of the independent counsel provisions of the Ethics in Government Act, but the D.C. Circuit rejected his claim in 1987.

During the investigation, Seymour stirred controversy by issuing a subpoena to the Gotliebs, seeking their testimony. The Canadian government lodged a formal protest with the U.S. government, arguing that an attempt to serve the subpoena was a violation of diplomatic immunity, and the U.S. Department of State urged Seymour to drop the subpoena. The U.S. district court quashed the subpoena on grounds of diplomatic immunity and ruled Allan Gotlieb had not waived his immunity by agreeing to respond to written questions from the independent counsel. Gotlieb ultimately did not testify at Deaver's 1987 trial, although former national security adviser Robert C. McFarlane and former U.S. ambassador to Canada Paul H. Robinson Jr. did both testify as witnesses for the prosecution. Deaver was convicted of perjury.

Later life and death
Seymour eschewed conventional notions of retirement, and remained active as a New York lawyer into his 90s. In 2000 and 2001, he represented cartoonist Dan DeCarlo in his unsuccessful litigation against Archie Comics over ownership of Josie and the Pussycats.

Seymour died at Charlotte Hungerford Hospital in Torrington, Connecticut, on June 29, 2019, at age 95.

Civic leadership

Seymour served at various points as president of the New York State Bar Association, trustee of the New York Public Library, and director of the Municipal Art Society of New York. In August 1964, the Municipal Art Society designated Seymour as the leader of its efforts to permanently establish the New York City Landmarks Preservation Commission. As a prominent civic leader, Seymour's efforts were instrumental in the passage of the Landmarks Law in 1965.

In 1976, Seymour organized the National Citizens Emergency Committee to Save Our Public Libraries, which advocated for public libraries and opposed budget cuts. Seymour was a staunch opponent of political action committees, believing them to have a malign effect on Congress, and was a founder of Citizens Against PACs.

Writings 
Seymour authored three books:

 In Why Justice Fails (Morrow, 1973), Seymour addressed a variety of issues, including overburdened courts and flaws in the prison system, and recommended various reforms.
 In United States Attorney: An Inside View of 'Justice' in America Under the Nixon Administration (Morrow, 1975), Seymour reviewed the history of federal law enforcement, criticized bureaucracy in the U.S. Department of Justice, called for more vigorous investigation and prosecution of white-collar crimes, and criticized the "arrogance and political expediency in the Nixon Justice Department." Seymour proposed a reform in which the Federal Bureau of Investigation would be separated from the Justice Department, and a new non-political post of chief prosecutor would be created. In a review of the book in ABA Journal, reviewer Richard J. Hoskins noted that the book was "not tightly organized" and wrote "Seymour is not a lively writer. He speaks with the force of straightforward conviction, but seldom with style." Hoskins nevertheless called the book a worthwhile read in the aftermath of the Watergate scandal.
 In Making a Difference (Morrow, 1984), Seymour profiled various individuals—ranging from Prudence Crandall to Muhammad Ali to Alexander Woollcott—to show various character attributes linked to public service. A Kirkus review described the work as a "well-meaning sermon/book" and criticized the "relentlessly banal, uplift prose" as "bland and superficial."

In later life Seymour, his wife Catryna, and their daughters Tryntje and Gabriel, co-wrote and produced Stars in the Dark, a one-act play about Hans and Sophie Scholl and their role in the White Rose resistance group in Nazi Germany in the 1940s. The play, which took around five years to write, was released in 2008 (when Seymour was 85) and had five performances off-Broadway.

Personal life 
In 1951, Seymour married Catryna Ten Eyck, who died in 2017. He had two daughters. Seymour was a "rather formal man"; his tendency to "come across as a stiff, even dour, candidate" may have inhibited his political aspirations.

Seymour maintained homes in Greenwich Village, Manhattan, and Salisbury, Connecticut. He was an avid watercolorist and oil painter.

Seymour was an Episcopalian. He was a member of The Players.

Notes

References

External links
Oral history of Whitney North Seymour, Jr. from July 29, 2006, from the New York Preservation Archive Project, focusing on Seymour's work on historic preservation of New York courthouses, Washington Square Park, and South Street Seaport

|-

|-

1923 births
2019 deaths
20th-century American Episcopalians
21st-century American Episcopalians
20th-century American lawyers
20th-century American politicians
American environmentalists
American male dramatists and playwrights
United States Army personnel of World War II
Lawyers from New York City
Military personnel from New York City
Republican Party New York (state) state senators
Politicians from Huntington, West Virginia
Politicians from New York City
Princeton University alumni
Simpson Thacher & Bartlett people
United States Attorneys for the Southern District of New York
Writers from Huntington, West Virginia
Writers from New York City
Kent School alumni
Yale Law School alumni
United States Army officers
Lawyers from Huntington, West Virginia